Mr. Boop was a satirical webcomic created by Alec Robbins about a man married to Betty Boop. The comic launched on February 28, 2020. The comic comprises four 'books' made up of 217 strips.

Background

Creation 
Alec enjoyed the notion that a character designed as a sex symbol was now mostly remembered by grandmothers.

Robbins' comedic style was influenced by a company he works for, Abso Lutely Productions, especially their shows 'Jon Benjamin Has A Van', 'The Birthday Boys' & 'Nathan For You.'''

 Book I 
After one week, 17 total strips were published.

By the 45th strip, Robbins began using characters that 'people have well-known sexual obsessions with online,' such as Jessica Rabbit or Gardevoir from Pokémon. Alec also noted that his inclusion of Ranma was personal to him, as the character resonated with him when he was young. Proceeds from this initial pressing went towards charities and GoFundMe pages benefiting the Black Community.

 Book II 
Like Book I, Book II featured 'guest strips' drawn by various artists, notably Kate Leth, Ryan North, and Night in the Woods creator Scott Benson.

 Book III 
The book features a meta-narrative about Betty Boop's father breaking up the marriage between Alec and Betty as it breaches copyright law. The arc was fuelled by a 'scare' Robbins had with copyright violation, which, combined with a want to shift gears into other topics.

The physical version of Book III also featured guest strips, most notably from American artist Julia Kaye. Book III concluded with a series of two short videos, featuring appearances from Tim Robinson, Mara Wilson and Justin McElroy.

 Book IV 
The book contains horror elements. As of May 2022, Robbins had his reservations about the ending, unsure if he was sending out the right message, that it is bad to 'fall into fantasy worlds and enjoy them'.

ReceptionMr. Boop was shortlisted for Heidi MacDonald's 2021 'Cartoonists Studio Prize', and was nominated for an Ignatz Award. Zachary Jenkins of ComicsXF said "Until the team behind Sonic understands our dark desires, we will have to fulfill our needs with underground art like Mr. Boop." In 2022, Silver Sprocket released a hardcover collection of the entirety of Mr. Boop, which won the Ignatz Award for Outstanding Collection later that year.The Verge'' called it "a hilarious, sometimes existentially troubling interrogation of what’s fascinating about fandoms and dumb about copyright law" and "a note-perfect satire of a very specific time on the internet".

References

External links
 Free Sex, Free Beer, Free Speech – Mr. Boop and the Problem of Desire

2020 webcomic debuts
2021 webcomic endings
American webcomics
Betty Boop
Romance webcomics
Satirical webcomics